Shebartoo  (also Shibartu, Shibartoo, Shibarto, Sebartoo, Shebarto, Shebartu, Sebartu, Sibartoo), (Dari/Hazaragi language: شیبرتو/شبرتو, Dasht-e Shebartu) is a plain in Shahidan (Shaidan) district, west of Bamiyan city, the provincial capital of Bamyan Province. The Shebartoo lies on the Bamiyan — Band-e Amir — Yakawlang road, about half-way between the Bamiyan valley and the Band-e Amir lakes.

Villages
The seven villages located on the Shebartoo are:
 Pirdad : پیرداد
 Habashi : حبشی
 Eikhtiyaran : اختیاران
 Kaj : کج
 Goombazi :گومبزی
 Sarma Ghol : سرما قول
 Bum-e Shibar : بوم شیبر

Population
The people who live on the Shebartoo are known as the Shebartoo Hazara.

Airport
The gravel strip known as Shebartoo Airport, which is also called Bamiyan Airport (ICAO: OABN; IATA: BIN), is the main airport for Bamiyan Province.

Notes

Further reading
 Weber, Olivier (2006) "Chapitre 52: Vallon de Shebartu" Le grand festin de l'Orient ("Chapter 52: Shebartu Valley" The Great Feast of the East) R. Laffont, Paris, in French; an earlier edition by the same publisher was published in 2004, 

Landforms of Bamyan Province
Hazarajat